Jane Mathison Haining (6 June 1897 – 17 July 1944) was a Scottish missionary for the Church of Scotland in Budapest, Hungary, who was recognized in 1997 by Yad Vashem in Israel as Righteous Among the Nations for having risked her life to help Jews during the Holocaust.

Haining worked in Budapest from June 1932 as matron of a boarding house for Jewish and Christian girls in a school run by the Scottish Mission to the Jews. In or around 1940, after the outbreak of World War II in 1939, the Church of Scotland advised Haining to return to Britain, but she decided to stay in Hungary. When Germany invaded Hungary in March 1944, the SS began arranging the deportation of the country's Jews to Auschwitz II-Birkenau, the German extermination camp in occupied Poland. Arrested by the Gestapo in April 1944 on a variety of charges, apparently after a dispute with the school's cook, Haining was herself deported to Auschwitz-Birkenau in May. She died there two months later, probably as a result of starvation and the camp's catastrophic living conditions.

Little is known about Haining's work in Budapest or death in Auschwitz. In 1949 a Scottish minister, the Reverend David McDougall (1889–1964), editor of the Jewish Mission Quarterly, published a 21-page booklet about her, Jane Haining of Budapest. According to Jennifer Robertson, writing in 2014 for PRISM: An Interdisciplinary Journal for Holocaust Educators, almost all subsequent publications about Haining depend on McDougall's booklet.

Early life and education

Born at Lochenhead Farm in Dunscore, Dumfriesshire, Scotland, Haining was the fifth child of Jane Mathison and her husband, Thomas John Haining, a farmer, who had married in 1890. Mathison, herself from a farming family, died in 1902 while giving birth to the couple's sixth child, when Haining was about five. Haining's father remarried in January 1922 and died that June. Toward the end of the year, his second wife, Robertina Maxwell, gave birth to a daughter, Agnes.

Haining grew up as a member of the evangelical Craig Church in Dunscore, part of the United Free Church of Scotland. Educated at Dunscore village school, she won a scholarship to Dumfries Academy in 1909, as her older sisters Alison and Margaret had done, where she lived as a boarder in the Moat Hostel for Girls. She graduated as the school dux, one of 41 school prizes she was awarded, and left with Highers in English, French, German, Latin and Mathematics.

Career

Secretarial work, retraining
After graduating, Haining trained at the Athenaeum Commercial College in Glasgow, and from 1917 until 1927 worked in Paisley for J. and P Coats Ltd, a thread manufacturer, first as a clerk, then as secretary to the private secretary. During this period, she lived at 50 Forth Street, Pollokshields, Glasgow, and attended the nearby Queen's Park West United Free Church, where she taught Sunday School. According to Nan Potter, who attended the classes, Haining would buy the children cream buns for tuppence ha'penny. It was around this time that she became interested in becoming a missionary. In 1927 she attended a meeting in Glasgow of the Jewish Mission Committee and heard Rev. Dr. George Mackenzie, chair of the committee, discuss his missionary work. She reportedly told a friend "I have found my lifework!"

Her manager at work was ill at the time, so Haining stayed with Coats for another five months, then another year while he trained her replacement. There followed a one-year diploma course at the Glasgow College of Domestic Science, which gave her a qualification in domestic science and housekeeping. She took a temporary post in Glasgow, then in Manchester as a matron. In or around 1932 she responded to an advertisement in the Church of Scotland magazine Life and Work, looking for a matron for the girls' hostel attached to its Jewish mission school in Budapest. The majority of the United Free Church of Scotland had united with the Church of Scotland in 1929.

Scottish mission

The Jewish mission ran a school for both Jewish and Christian girls in its mission building at 51 Vörösmarty Street. The Church of Scotland had established the mission, also known as St Columba's Church, in 1841 to evangelize Hungarian Jews. The founding ministers, Alexander Black and Alexander Keith, along with Andrew Bonar and Robert Murray M'Cheyne, had been making their way to Jerusalem to spread Christianity, when Black is reported to have injured himself falling from his camel, as a result of which he and Keith decided to return to Scotland. They did so via Budapest, where their stay became protracted when Keith fell ill. The Archduchess Dorothea of Austria befriended them there, and the men were persuaded to establish a Scottish mission in that city.

Work for the mission
The Jewish mission committee sent Haining for further training at St Colm's Women's Missionary College in Edinburgh. Her dedication service took place at St Stephen's Church, Edinburgh, on 19 June 1932, during a service presided over by the chair of the Jewish mission committee, Dr. Stewart Thompson. Haining left for Budapest the next day, seven months before Adolf Hitler became Chancellor of Germany on 30 January 1933.

The girls' home was on the third floor of the Vörösmarty Street mission building, and consisted of two bedrooms with about 16 girls in each room, as of 1932. Most of the students were Jews. McDougall wrote in 1949: "Not all the girls were Jewesses however, for it was considered wise to have a proportion of Christian girls among them."

Haining wrote that the school had 400 pupils ranging from six to 16; 30–40 of them were boarders, either live-in or day boarders. These were the girls for whom Haining was responsible. Although Hungarian law did not allow religious conversion before the age of 18, she wrote, the school aimed to prepare its Jewish students for conversion to Christianity. The daily Bible lesson for all pupils included study of the New Testament. Haining made efforts to have part of the building converted to club rooms, so that the evangelical work could continue for girls who had left the school, as most did when they were 14 or 15.

World War II
When World War II broke out on 3 September 1939, Haining was on holiday in Cornwall with Margit Prém, the Hungarian head of the mission's elementary school. The women returned immediately to Budapest. They had hoped to take Haining's sister Agnes back with them for a visit, but the war changed their plans. According to McDougall, Haining wrote to someone: "The journey back was a nightmare—five changes, no porters, no hot food, crowded trains like Bank Holiday plus luggage, no sanitary conveniences fit to mention, two nights spent on the platform beside, or on, our luggage." In 1940 the Church of Scotland missions committee in Edinburgh advised her to return to Scotland, but according to McDougall she felt safe in Hungary and decided to stay. He mentioned her briefly in his book In Search of Israel (1941): "Miss Haining, the matron of the girls' home, stayed on after the others, and she is there still. By roundabout ways we hear from her sometimes." She wrote to someone shortly after the outbreak of war:

From then on, particularly from 1941, Jewish refugees from all over German-occupied Europe began arriving in Hungary to escape the Holocaust. According to McDougall, Haining wrote to someone in or around 1938: "What a ghastly feeling it must be to know that no one wants you and to feel that your neighbours literally grudge you your daily bread." According to one colleague, she would rise at 5 am on market days to find food for the home and would carry the heavy bags back herself. She is reported to have cut up her leather suitcase to repair the girls' shoes. A pupil at the school told a filmmaker decades later: "We understood even as third-graders, that we are protected here, we are not harmed, we are protected, and we are equals. We could see, we could understand this, because they behaved accordingly."

Rev. George Knight, the mission's superintendent, wrote in 1944, after Haining's death: "During those awful years of the 'war of nerves,' when refugees were pouring out of Germany into the comparative safety of Hungary, the Mission staff spent a hectic time attempting to aid those émigrés to continue their flight to Great Britain and the Western Hemisphere. We established a training school for prospective domestic servants and Miss Haining ... gave courses of lectures to Jewish refugees on British conditions."

German invasion of Hungary

On 19 March 1944, the German Wehrmacht invaded Hungary, and the SS immediately began arranging for the country's Jews to be deported to Auschwitz. SS-Obersturmbannführer Adolf Eichmann and his Sondereinsatzkommando Ungarn ("special intervention unit Hungary") arrived in Budapest to take charge of the deportations. On 31 March a range of anti-Jewish restrictions were introduced, in force as of 5 April: Jews were forbidden from owning cars and radios, using telephones, moving home, wearing school uniform, or using public baths, swimming pools, public restaurants, cafes, bars or catering services. They had to declare any property except for a small amount of household items. Jewish lawyers, civil servants, and journalists were sacked, non-Jews were not allowed to work in Jewish households, books by Jews could not be published, and those already in existence could not be borrowed from libraries.

Jews over the age of six were required to wear a 10 x 10 cm yellow badge in the shape of the Star of David on the left chest of their outer clothing. Following the decree, Jews would be arrested for petty issues, such as wearing a star of the wrong size. In mid-April 1944 the SS began herding them into holding areas, including ghettos and brick factories, where they were held for weeks with little to eat.

Arrest

Charges
The Church of Scotland Jewish mission committee in Edinburgh wrote to the British Foreign Office around the time of the invasion of Hungary that it was "under a very deep debt of gratitude to Miss Jane Haining ... By her personal influence and faithfulness she has inspired such loyalty that the Budapest [Jewish] Mission has maintained its former high standards. Recent events have seriously altered the situation and the thoughts of the Church will be with [her] and her colleagues in the new difficulties that have arisen."

In late April or early May 1944 (25 April, according to Bishop László Ravasz of the Reformed Church in Hungary), two officers from the Gestapo (the German secret police) arrived at the mission home to arrest Haining. They searched her office and bedroom, and gave her 15 minutes to pack. According to one colleague's diary entry on 30 April 1944, Haining was "now in the cellars of Police HQ. I asked [the consulate] why and was told that a charwoman denounced her of having a secret radio receiver". She was at first held in a house used by the Gestapo in the Buda Hills, before being moved to Fő utca ("Main Street") prison. Her friends took her weekly parcels of food and clean underwear. According to a fellow prisoner, Miss Francis W. Lee, as told by David McDougall in 1949 (Lee survived the war and moved to New Zealand), Haining was questioned twice and had the following charges put to her:

According to McDougall, Haining had been given permission by the Hungarian government to visit British prisoners of war, and she had indeed sent them parcels. After admitting the charges, except for the allegation of political activity, Haining was moved to the Kistarcsa transit camp. Her friends arrived at the Fő utca prison with food and clean underwear, but she had gone. Francis Lee wrote in July 1945 to Dr. Laszlo Nagy of the Hungarian Reformed Church:

Bishop László Ravasz told the Scottish Mission in 1946 that he had tried to obtain support for Haining from Admiral Miklós Horthy, the Regent of Hungary, who, Ravasz said, "learned of the case with deep regret and assured me of his sympathy for the Church of Scotland and all her workers". Ravasz also spoke to or met with the State Secretary Miklos Mester and the Hungarian prime minister, who, at the time of Haining's arrest, was Döme Sztójay. Ravasz understood that the prime minister had instructed an under-secretary to seek Haining's release, but Ravasz received no further reply to his inquiries.

Mass deportations to Auschwitz

In April 1944, the Germans began deporting Hungary's Jews to the German extermination camp Auschwitz II-Birkenau in occupied Poland. The mass transports began on 15 May. Between then and 9 July 1944, the SS deported the Jewish community in closed goods wagons at a rate of 12,000 a day. According to Edmund Veesenmayer, Hitler's minister in Hungary, 437,402 Hungarian Jews were deported, constituting almost the entire Jewish population of Hungary's countryside. Deportees were taken in Hungarian trains to the Slovak border, then transferred to German trains to be taken to southern Poland, a journey of about two days. Squeezed into the wagons in horrendous conditions, with little air, light, food or water, with buckets for latrines and no privacy, many people died during the journey. Gertrud "Trude" Levi was deported from Hungary to Auschwitz in 1944:

From May 1944 the trains into Auschwitz II arrived on a new train spur that had been built to carry the Hungarian Jews directly into the camp. The three-track line, which stopped near the gas chambers, meant that a new train could arrive while a previous one was being unloaded. The crematoria could barely cope; the Sonderkommando (prisoners forced to work there) had to start burning bodies in open fire pits. About 90 per cent of the Hungarian Jews who survived the journey to Auschwitz were sent to the gas chambers on arrival; the rest were selected for slave labour.

Haining's deportation, final letter

According to the Polish historian Danuta Czech, Haining was deported to Auschwitz II on 15 May 1944. According to David McDougall, she was taken to Auschwitz along with 90 other prisoners from the Kistarcsa transit camp. One former pupil said that many of the Jewish girls from the Scottish mission also ended up in Auschwitz; a few survived.

Selected for work rather than the gas chamber, Haining was given the serial number 79467 and probably had the number tattooed on her arm. She sent a postcard from Auschwitz, written in German, to Margit Prém of the mission school. (The card was forwarded on 1 August 1956 to the Church of Scotland's Department of World Mission.) Postmarked "Auschwitz, Oberschlesien", 21 July 1944, one side is headed "Konzentrationslager Auschwitz" ("Auschwitz concentration camp") and lists the rules for corresponding with prisoners. The other side is dated 15 July 1944, written in pencil:

Death
According to a death certificate that arrived in Edinburgh on 17 August 1944, Haining died in hospital, presumably in Auschwitz, on 17 July 1944, two days after the date written in pencil on her card to Margit Prém. Delivered courtesy of the German legation in Budapest and the Swiss government, the death certificate stated: "Miss Haining who was arrested on account of justified suspicion of espionage against Germany, died in hospital, July 17th, of cachexia following intestinal catarrh." In June 1946, the Church of Scotland magazine Life and Work reported that the Scottish Mission in Budapest had received a letter about Haining from Bishop Ravasz in Budapest, describing his efforts in 1944 to bring her arrest to the attention of the Hungarian government. The final response he received was "a package which was delivered at the end of July to the Scottish Mission, and from which it could be ascertained that Miss Haining lost her life in a German concentration camp".  Bishop Ravasz added to his letter:

Haining's Bible was found in the mission home after the war, and is on display in the mission building. Some of her belongings were found in 2016 in the attic space of the Church of Scotland's head office in George Street, Edinburgh. They included her handwritten will, dated July 1942, and over 70 photographs of the girls in the mission school. The items were placed in the National Library of Scotland.

Memorials

Little was known about Auschwitz when Haining died. Robertson writes that a 1944 Church of Scotland report stated that she had been sent to a "detention camp for women in Auschwitz in Upper Silesia", and her family's tombstone in the Irongray churchyard near Castle Douglas placed her death in Germany. The Scottish Mission in Budapest unveiled a memorial tablet for her in 1946. In June 1948 two stained glass windows in her honour were installed in the vestibule of Queen's Park Govanhill Parish Church in Glasgow, where she worshipped.

On 27 January 1997—International Holocaust Remembrance Day and the 52nd anniversary of the liberation of Auschwitz—Yad Vashem, Israel's Holocaust memorial, recognized Haining as Righteous Among the Nations. Her name is inscribed on a wall of honour in the Garden of the Righteous in Jerusalem. The honour is awarded to non-Jews who risked their lives to save Jews during the Holocaust. Twenty-two British people had been recognized as of January 2018. Haining was the second Scot; Tommy Noble, a Scottish POW, was made Righteous Among the Nations in 1988.

Other memorials to Haining include a cairn near Dunscore Church, made possible in 2005 by public donation, and a Church of Scotland "Jane Haining prize", which arranges an annual visit to Scotland for a Hungarian teacher and two students. In 2010 the city of Budapest renamed a section of an embankment after her: Pesti alsó rakpart (Pest-side lower embankment, along the Danube between the Széchenyi Chain Bridge and Elizabeth Bridge) became Jane Haining rakpart. Also in 2010, the British government named her a British Hero of the Holocaust. In 2016, a memorial event attended by former pupils of the mission school was held in Hungary and in 2017 Haining was again honoured by the city of Budapest in a new exhibition at its Holocaust Memorial Centre.

Karine Polwart, the Scottish singer-songwriter, wrote a song about Haining entitled "Baleerie Baloo" (named after the Scottish lullaby Baloo Baleerie) for her 2006 album, Scribbled in Chalk. In 2009 Raymond Raszkowski Ross based a play on her life, A Promised Land, and New Zealand journalist Lynley Smith wrote a fictionalised diary, From Matron to Martyr (2012), based on Haining's life. In 2016 Haining was named in the video accompanying "Girl (Daughter of Scotland)", a Scottish women's anthem by Sharon Martin. BBC Scotland poet-in-residence Stuart A. Paterson wrote a tribute to Haining for National Holocaust Memorial Day 2018, "In Days of Darkness".

Seventy-five years after her death the Church of Scotland's Life and Work magazine reprinted its 1946 article about her dedication and death: ' A Gallant Lady' who 'Faced the Gestapo'.

On 10 June 2021, the Scottish Episcopal Church at its General Synod voted to include Haining in its calendar of saints and heroes. She will be remembered on 17 July.

See also
List of Righteous Among the Nations by country
Eric Liddell - Scottish Olympic Gold medal winner and Christian missionary who died in a Japanese Prison Camp in China in 1945

Sources

Notes

References

Works cited
News sources and websites are listed in References only.
On Haining

 
 
 
 
 
 
 
 
 
 
 
 
 

On the Holocaust or Jewish missions

Further reading

 
 
 
 
 
 
 
 
 

1897 births
1944 deaths
British civilians killed in World War II
British people who died in Auschwitz concentration camp
British Righteous Among the Nations
British women in World War II
British evangelicals
Female Christian missionaries
People educated at Dumfries Academy
People from Dumfries and Galloway
Presbyterian missionaries in Europe
Protestant missionaries in Hungary
Protestant Righteous Among the Nations
Scottish Presbyterian missionaries
Scottish expatriates in Hungary
Scottish evangelicals